Relativity is the third and last studio album by Australian pop group Indecent Obsession. Released in 1993, it is notable for minor hits such as "Fixing a Broken Heart" and "Lady Rain" in South Africa and parts of Asia, with "Fixing a Broken Heart" becoming most popular in the Philippines.

Track listing
 "Fall from Grace" (4:49)
 "Waiting for Me" (4:08)
 "Glory of Burning" (4:07)
 "Lady Rain" (4:12)
 "Healing Water" (4:25)
 "Changes" (4:12)
 "One Bad Dream" (4:10)
 "Feel It" (3:37)
 "Fixing a Broken Heart" (3:33)
 "My Reflection" (4:17)
 "Taste Your Heaven" (4:07)
 "Alaskan Soul" (5:49)
 "Whispers in the Dark" (Acoustic 94) (4:44)

References

1993 albums
Indecent Obsession albums
MCA Records albums